Arvydas Juozaitis (born 18 April 1956 in Vilnius) is a Lithuanian writer, philosopher, politician, cultural worker and former swimmer who won a bronze medal in the 100 meter breaststroke at the 1976 Summer Olympics. In 1988, he was a member of the Sąjūdis Initiative Group. He was registered as a candidate for 2019 Lithuanian presidential election.

References

1956 births
21st-century Lithuanian politicians
Lithuanian male writers
20th-century Lithuanian philosophers
Lithuanian male breaststroke swimmers
Medalists at the 1976 Summer Olympics
Olympic bronze medalists for the Soviet Union
Olympic bronze medalists in swimming
Olympic swimmers of Lithuania
Olympic swimmers of the Soviet Union
Politicians from Vilnius
Sportspeople from Vilnius
Swimmers at the 1976 Summer Olympics
Vilnius University alumni
Writers from Vilnius
Living people
Independent politicians in Lithuania
Soviet male breaststroke swimmers
21st-century Lithuanian philosophers